KSBS may refer to:

 KSBS-FM, a radio station (92.1 FM) licensed to serve Pago Pago, American Samoa
 KSBS-CD, a low-power digital television station (channel 19, virtual 10) licensed to serve Denver, Colorado, United States
 KSBS-TV, former call sign (2000–2007) of PBS station KRMZ in Colorado
 the ICAO code for Steamboat Springs Airport